Lisina or Líšina may refer to:

Places
 Lisina, a village in Serbia
 Líšina, a village the Czech Republic
 Donja Lisina, a village in Serbia
 Gornja Lisina, a village in Serbia
 Jadovnik Lisina, a mountain in Bosnia and Herzegovina

People
 Yekaterina Lisina, Russian basketball player, and world's tallest female model as at September 2017

Other

See also